Expedición Robinson 2001, was the second season of the Argentine version of the Swedish show Expedition Robinson and it aired 2001. Like the previous season, this season took place on an island in Belize. During the pre-merge portion of the competition the North team proved to be weaker than their South team counterparts, only winning two of the six immunity challenges and losing four in a row. Shortly after the merge the former South team members turned on each other, voting out two of their own. When the black vote came into the game a bitter Carla Cavalloni took revenge on her tribe by joining the former North team members in voting out her former tribe member Pablo González. When it came time for the final four, the remaining contestants competed in two challenges to determine who would be the final two. Ultimately, María Victoria "Vick" Fernández who defied the odds and won this season over Carla Levy by a jury vote of 5-2.

Contestants
There were sixteen contestants overall, divided into two tribes, the North Team and the South Team. After six contestants were eliminated, the tribes were combined, or merged, to form one tribe, Robinson. Seven contestants made up the jury, who ultimately decided between the final two contestants who would win the game.

Season summary

Voting history

External links
https://web.archive.org/web/20020213080406/http://www.robinson.aol.com.ar/2001/Participantes/index.adp (Official Site Archive)

Argentine
Argentine reality television series
2001 Argentine television seasons